Gnathopogon is a genus of cyprinid fish found in eastern Asia.  There are currently nine species in this genus.

Species
Gnathopogon has the following species.
 Gnathopogon caerulescens (Sauvage, 1883)
 Gnathopogon elongatus (Temminck & Schlegel, 1846)
 Gnathopogon herzensteini (Günther, 1896)
 Gnathopogon imberbis (Sauvage & Dabry de Thiersant, 1874)
 Gnathopogon nicholsi (P. W. Fang, 1943)
 Gnathopogon polytaenia (Nichols, 1925)
 Gnathopogon strigatus (Regan, 1908) (Manchurian gudgeon)
 Gnathopogon taeniellus (Nichols, 1925)
 Gnathopogon tsinanensis (T. Mori, 1928)

References

 
Fish of Asia
Taxa named by Pieter Bleeker
Freshwater fish genera
Ray-finned fish genera